The 2009 Monza Superleague Formula round was the fifth round of the 2009 Superleague Formula season, with the races taking place on October 4, 2009.

Report

Qualifying

Race 1

Race 2

Results

Qualifying
 In each group, the top four qualify for the quarter-finals.

Group A

Group B

Knockout stages

Grid

Race 1

Race 2

Standings after the round

References

External links
 Official results from the Superleague Formula website

Monza
Superleague Formula